The 2022 State of Origin series was the 41st annual best-of-three series between the Queensland and New South Wales rugby league teams. Before this series, Queensland had won 22 times, NSW 16 times, with two series drawn.

Game I 
Game One was a fiery encounter played at Sydney's Accor Stadium, and won by Queensland, 16-10.

Blues centre Jack Wighton and Queensland five-eighth Cameron Munster produced performances of note, with the latter named Man of the Match. The match was also notable for its high attendance of 80,512 people, the highest rugby league attendance since the onset of the COVID-19 pandemic.

Game II
Game Two, held at Perth's Optus Stadium, before a sellout crowd of 59,358, saw Matt Burton and Nathan Cleary masterclasses deliver New South Wales a 44-12 victory to level the series at 1-1. Cleary scored 2 tries and 8 goals for a combined points total of 24, the second highest behind Ryan Girdler's 32 in New South Wales' 56-16 demolition of Queensland in Game III 2000.

Game III 
Game Three, held at Suncorp Stadium started with three players being knocked out in the opening three minutes of the contest (Cameron Murray, Selwyn Cobbo and Lindsay Collins). After this, Queensland scored the opening try, before NSW exploded to take a 12-6 lead with tries to Jarome Luai and Jacob Saifiti. However, Queensland drew back within two points just before half time, capitalising on a dropped bomb from Daniel Tupou. 

The second half began with a brawl between Queensland centre Dane Gagai and New South Wales centre Matt Burton. Gagai and Burton were both sent to the sin bin. From this moment on, Queensland began to wrestle momentum back through the kicking game of Daly Cherry-Evans and Ben Hunt, pinning New South Wales down their own end. The match was won by a try to Kalyn Ponga and a sealing chargedown try to Broncos Grand Final-turned current Dragons halfback Hunt, who sprinted 80 metres to score.

Player debuts 

Game 1 
  Cap no. 298, Kotoni Staggs
 Cap no. 299, Stephen Crichton
 Cap no. 300, Ryan Matterson

  Cap no. 222, Selwyn Cobbo
  Cap no. 223, Reuben Cotter
  Cap no. 224, Patrick Carrigan
  Cap no. 225, Jeremiah Nanai

Game 2 
  Cap no. 301, Matt Burton
 Cap no. 302, Siosifa Talakai

  Cap no. 226, Murray Taulagi

Game 3 
  Cap no. 303, Jacob Saifiti

  Cap no. 227, Tom Dearden
  Cap no. 228, Tom Gilbert

Women's State of Origin

Women's Under 19 State of Origin

Men's Under 19 State of Origin

Wheelchair State of Origin 
A Wheelchair rugby league State of Origin match is scheduled to be played in Townsville on 23 July 2022.

Squads 
On 30 June 2022, the New South Wales Rugby League named the New South Wales team for this match: Jason Attard ( Wests Tigers), Cory Cannane ( St George Illawarra Dragons), Craig Cannane (c) ( St George Illawarra Dragons), William Derederenalagi ( Parramatta Eels), Rick Engles ( St George Illawarra Dragons), Brad Grove (c) ( Wests Tigers), Diab Karim ( Parramatta Eels), Liam Luff ( Parramatta Eels), Chris O’Brien ( Canberra Raiders), Toby Popple ( Canberra Raiders), Reserves: Zac Carl ( Canberra Raiders), Edge Iole ( St George Illawarra Dragons).

See Also 

 2022 Australian football code crowds

References 

State of Origin series